Jackson Jackson is a hip hop group from Melbourne, Australia consisting of Harry James Angus (vocals/trumpet; The Cat Empire, The Conglomerate) and Jan Skubiszewski (producer, phrase, and composer; APRA Award winner Two Hands, The Rage in Placid Lake, Last Man Standing). For live performances, they are joined by keyboards, bass, drums and backup vocalists.

Jackson Jackson's first album, The Fire Is on the Bird, was released on 24 March 2007. They describe their music as a fusion of hip hop, afrobeat and psychobilly.

The duo generated a loyal following through exposure on MySpace, YouTube and on the late-night ABC music video show Rage.

Jackson Jackson's second album, Tools For Survival, was released on 11 October 2008.

The band appeared as a guest on Phrase's second album Clockwork in 2009, performing on the song "Paradise".

In April 2010, Jackson Jackson performed at The Evelyn in Melbourne for three Fridays in a row before going on hiatus to write a new album.

In September 2011, Jackson Jackson returned to The Evelyn Hotel to take residency of the venue for a month, performing each Friday. Their first show since April 2010 was Friday 2 September, and was supported by the singer Gossling. During their performance, they performed two new songs called "Dave" and "Sacrifice". They also sold a three-track EP, consisting of the tracks "Dave", "Sacrifice", and "Simplify My Life, Amplify My Mind".

Band members

Core members
Jackson Jackson are:
 Harry Angus – vocals, acoustic guitar and synths
 Jan Skubiszewski – electric/acoustic guitars, synths and beats

Rhythm section
Also known as Melbourne dub/fusion trio, 'The Genie', and the rhythm section of Melbourne band The Cat Empire.
 Ollie McGill – keyboards
 Ryan Monro – basses and guitar
 Will Hull-Brown – drums

Choir
Named the 'Jackson Jackson 5'.
 Chantal Mitvalsky
 Elana Stone
 Rebecca Ari
 Karishma Sadhai
 Rory Osman

Discography

Albums

Singles

Other appearances
 Clockwork (2009)
 Underbelly: A Tale of Two Cities (Soundtrack) (2009)

References

Australian hip hop groups
Victoria (Australia) musical groups
Musical groups established in 2006
Australian musical duos
Hip hop duos
2006 establishments in Australia